Crafton station is an elevated busway station operated by Pittsburgh Regional Transit in Crafton, Pennsylvania. The station is located on the West Busway and is served by routes 28X, G2, G3 and G31.

The station has a 106-space park and ride lot.

References

Port Authority of Allegheny County stations
Bus stations in Pennsylvania
West Busway